Maxim Gourov (born January 30, 1979) is a Kazakhstani professional road bicycle racer. He is currently a free agent, having last ridden for the  team.

Major results

 Giro d'Italia – 118th
  Time Trial Championships – 
 Vuelta a la Argentina – 1 stage (2000)

External links 

Kazakhstani male cyclists
1979 births
Living people
Place of birth missing (living people)
20th-century Kazakhstani people
21st-century Kazakhstani people